Andrew Kessler Hay (January 19, 1809 – February 7, 1881) was an American Whig Party politician who represented New Jersey's 1st congressional district in the United States House of Representatives from 1849 to 1851.

Biography
Hay was born near Lowell, Massachusetts, on January 19, 1809. He completed preparatory studies and was employed in the manufacture of window glass. He moved to Waterford Works, New Jersey, in Winslow Township, New Jersey, in 1829, and engaged in the manufacture of glass. He was also largely interested in real estate and agriculture

Hay was elected as a Whig to the Thirty-first Congress, serving in office from March 4, 1849, to March 3, 1851, but declined to be a candidate for renomination to the Thirty-second Congress.

After leaving Congress, he resumed his business interests. He was a presidential elector on the Republican ticket in the 1872 United States presidential election. He was president of the Camden and Atlantic Railroad from 1872 to 1876.

Hay died in Winslow Township on February 7, 1881, and was interred in Colestown Cemetery in what is now Cherry Hill Township, New Jersey.

External links

Andrew Kessler Hay at The Political Graveyard

1809 births
1881 deaths
People from Winslow Township, New Jersey
Whig Party members of the United States House of Representatives from New Jersey
19th-century American politicians
Burials at Colestown Cemetery (Cherry Hill, New Jersey)